Photinus signaticollis is a species of firefly native to Argentina and Uruguay. In 2018 the species was observed in the northeast of the Iberian Peninsula, and initially described as a new species, Photinus immigrans. However, in 2022 it was found that the population in the Iberian Peninsula corresponded to the species Photinus signaticollis.

Expansion in Europe 
It is estimated that the introduction of Photinus signaticollis in the Iberian Peninsula could have occurred in 2016 in the province of Girona. 

The expansion of the species is very rapid, possibly due to the fact that the females can fly, unlike in European fireflies, and in 2020 it had already reached France. At this rate of expansion, it is estimated that in less than 40 years it could occupy metropolitan France and the Iberian Peninsula entirely, so control programs for the species may be necessary to avoid putting native species at risk.

References

Lampyridae
Bioluminescent insects
Beetles described in 1846
Beetles of South America